also known in the short form  is a Japanese harem, romantic comedy light novel series written by Tomo Hanama and illustrated by sune. It was published by Media Factory under their MF Bunko J imprint from January 2017 to January 2022. A total of fourteen volumes have been published. The series follows Keiki Kiryū, a high school student who seeks the identity of the sender of an unnamed love letter attached to underwear, which consequently leads him to discover the special hidden peculiarities of the girls in his life.

A manga adaptation of Hensuki with illustration by CHuN was serialized in Fujimi Shobo's shōnen manga magazine Monthly Dragon Age from November 2017 to December 2020. It has been collected into six tankōbon volumes as of February 2021. A drama CD was released in May 2018, along with a RPG browser game released on the same date. A 12-episode anime television series adaptation by Geek Toys aired from July to September 2019. The series is licensed in North America by Funimation, in Australia and New Zealand by Madman Entertainment, and in Southeast Asia and South Asia by Muse Communication.

Premise 

Hensuki revolves around Keiki Kiryū, an ordinary high school student who finds an anonymous love letter addressed to him. What makes things even more interesting is that attached to the letter, there's a pair of panties. To determine the identity of his secret admirer, referred to as "Cinderella", Keiki proceeds to investigate several possible candidates, including his senior and president of the  Sayuki Tokihara; his underclasswoman and assistant librarian Yuika Koga; and his classmate and close friend Mao Nanjō. However, as Keiki seeks to uncover who this mysterious girl might be, he discovers that every girl he suspects is singularly perverted and desperately interested in getting him to participate in their perversion.

Publication 

Hensuki is a light novel series written by Tomo Hanama and illustrated by sune. In addition to the five chapters composing the story of Hensuki, all volumes contain a prologue, an epilogue and an afterword by Hanama, respectively. From the first to the ninth, each volume presents, as cover art, the image of a female character of the series undressing. Media Factory released the first volume in Japan on January 25, 2017, under their MF Bunko J imprint. The eighth volume of the series was launched on July 25, 2019, along with a special edition containing additional illustrations. As of June 25, 2021, a total of thirteen volumes have been released. The fourteenth and final volume was released on January 25, 2022.

Media

Manga 

A manga adaptation written by Hanama and illustrated by CHuN was serialized in Fujimi Shobo's shōnen manga magazine Monthly Dragon Age from November 9, 2017, to December 9, 2020. Fujimi Shobo has collected its chapters into individual tankōbon volumes. The series was compiled into six volumes, with the last one being released on February 9, 2021.

A spin-off manga, titled  was illustrated by kanbe and Hanamoto. It contains alternate, what-if scenarios between the protagonist Keiki Kiryū and the female characters of the series. Hakusensha released its first and only seven-chapter volume on April 24, 2020, under their Young Animal Comics imprint.

Drama CD 
A drama CD for Hensuki, produced by Mosaic.wav and Yksb and published by Seaside Communications, was released on May 25, 2018, featuring the same voice cast from the anime, along with character songs.

Anime 

An anime television series adaptation was announced on February 20, 2019. The series was animated by Geek Toys and directed by Itsuki Imazaki, with Kenichi Yamashita handling series composition, and Yōsuke Itō designing the characters. Youichi Sakai composed the series' music. Seven was credited for animation production assistance. Ayaka Ōhashi performed the series' opening theme song  which was also used as the ending theme for the twelfth episode. Mia Regina performed the series' ending theme song  Mia Regina also performed the theme song  which was inserted into the seventh episode.  which is performed by TRUE, was used as the ending theme for the seventh episode.

The series aired from July 8 to September 23, 2019, on AT-X, Tokyo MX, MBS, and BS11. The series ran for 12 episodes. The series is licensed in North America by Funimation, in Australia and New Zealand by Madman Entertainment, and in Southeast Asia and South Asia by Muse Communication. A short anime spin-off titled  ran after episodes of the main anime on AT-X. The shorts were directed and written by Itsuki Imazaki.

Web radio 
A web radio show, titled  hosted by Ayana Taketatsu and Rina Hidaka, who voiced Sayuki Tokihara and Yuika Koga in the anime adaptation of Hensuki, respectively, was broadcast every Thursday from June 27 to October 3, 2019.

Video game 
A RPG browser game adaptation of Hensuki was developed by Tatsutori in collaboration with Atsumaru. The game, titled  was directed by Haruya Toma and produced by Junichi Yoshizawa and Asahiko Itada. It follows the plot of the series, with the player taking on the role of Keiki as he tries to discover the identity of the sender of a love letter addressed to him. In addition, the game also includes some of sune's illustrations from the light novel. Hensuki: Are You Willing to Fall in Love with a Pervert, as Long as She's a Cutie? [Love × Sugoroku] was released on May 25, 2018, with free post-launch updates being added at monthly intervals.

Reception

Sales 
In Japan, the seventh volume of Hensuki has estimated the sales of over 8,792 copies, being one of top-selling light novels from February 18 to March 11, 2019. As of January 2020, the light novel has over 750,000 copies in circulation.

Critical response 
Reviewing for SAE With a K, Dez Polycarpe said, "This is a fun anime to watch and one that I would recommend to a harem lover. [T]his one stuck to me because it is done to give your a laugh each episode. While also showing you that you should definitely not judge a book by its cover. As our main protagonist finds this out a multitude of times." Writing for Anime Hajime, a reviewer (identified only as 'LofZOdyssey') stated, "Although this show had a strong main character and I would be lying if I said I didn’t have some fun with it, that wasn’t enough. The majority of this series was as generic as can be, from the animation to the story to the mystery to the supporting cast. For that reason, it would be wrong for me to recommend this. After all, I would basically be saying you should go ahead and waste your time. Hensuki: Are You Willing to Fall in Love with a Pervert, as Long as She's a Cutie? is one you can skip."

See also 
List of harem anime and manga

Notes

References

External links 
 
 

2019 anime television series debuts
2017 Japanese novels
Anime and manga based on light novels
AT-X (TV network) original programming
Harem anime and manga
Fujimi Shobo manga
Funimation
Geek Toys
Kadokawa Dwango franchises
Light novels
MF Bunko J
Muse Communication
Romantic comedy anime and manga
Shōnen manga